Jorge Henrique de Souza (born 23 April 1982), or simply Jorge Henrique, is a Brazilian footballer who plays left midfield and right midfield for Democrata Futebol Clube (MG).

Career
Henrique has played for several teams throughout his 20+ years as a professional athlete.

Beginning his career with Nautico in 2002, he later played for Atletico-PR, Esporte Clube Santo Andre, Ceara SC, Santa Cruz Futbol Clube, Botafogo, Corinthians, Internacional, CR Vasco De Gama, Figueirense FC, Brasiliense FC, Camboriu Futebol Clube, and North Esporte Clube. On 1 January 2023, Henrique transferred to Democrata.

Statistics 

FIFA Club World Cup

Honours
Náutico
Pernambuco State League: 2004

Atlético Paranaense
Paraná State League: 2005

Botafogo
Taça Rio: 2007, 2008

Corinthians
São Paulo State League: 2009, 2013
Copa do Brasil: 2009
Campeonato Brasileiro Série A: 2011
Copa Libertadores: 2012
FIFA Club World Cup: 2012

Internacional
Rio Grande do Sul State League: 2014, 2015

Vasco da Gama
Rio De Janeiro State League: 2016

References

External links

 
 
 

1982 births
Living people
People from Resende
Brazilian footballers
Campeonato Brasileiro Série A players
Association football forwards
Clube Náutico Capibaribe players
Club Athletico Paranaense players
Esporte Clube Santo André players
Ceará Sporting Club players
Santa Cruz Futebol Clube players
Botafogo de Futebol e Regatas players
Sport Club Corinthians Paulista players
Sport Club Internacional players
CR Vasco da Gama players
Figueirense FC players
Sportspeople from Rio de Janeiro (state)